Oleksandr Martynenko (born 22 July 1989 in Donetsk) is a Ukrainian cyclist.

Palmares
2006
 World Junior Points Race Champion
2nd European Junior Points Race Championships
2011
1st Stages 2 & 5 Grand Prix of Adygea
1st Grand Prix of Moscow
2012
2nd Race Horizon Park
2013
3rd Grand Prix of Moscow

References

1989 births
Living people
Ukrainian male cyclists
Sportspeople from Donetsk